The procedures for voting in the Council of the European Union are described in the treaties of the European Union. The Council of the European Union (or simply "Council" or "Council of Ministers") has had its voting procedure amended by subsequent treaties and currently operates on the system set forth in the Treaty of Lisbon. The system is known as qualified majority voting.

Current qualified majority voting rules (since 2014)

Article 16 of the Treaty on European Union, as amended by the Treaty of Lisbon, stipulates that the Council voting arrangements of the Nice Treaty applied until 31 October 2014. Article 16 also states the conditions for a qualified majority, effective since 1 November 2014 (Lisbon rules):
 Majority of countries: 55% (comprising at least 15 of them), or 72% if acting on a proposal from neither the Commission nor from the High Representative,  and
 Majority of population: 65%.

A blocking minority requiresin addition to not meeting one of the two conditions abovethat at least 4 countries (or, if not all countries participate in the vote, the minimum number of countries representing more than 35% of the population of the participating countries, plus one country) vote against the proposal. Thus, there may be cases where an act is passed, even though the population condition is not met. This precludes scenarios where 3 populous countries could block a decision favored by the other 24 countries.

The Lisbon rules eradicated the use of "artificial" voting weights. This move, first proposed in the Constitution, is based on the size of populations and, at the same time, acknowledges the smaller member states' fears of being overruled by the larger countries.

Voting practice
In practice, the Council targeted unanimous decisions, and qualified majority voting was often simply used as a means to pressure compromises for consensus. For example, in 2008, 128 out of 147 Council decisions were unanimous. Within the remaining decisions, there was a total of 32 abstentions and 8 votes against the respective decision. These opposing votes were cast twice by Luxembourg and once by each of Austria, Belgium, Denmark, Spain, Netherlands, and Portugal.

Policy areas
The Council, jointly with the European Parliament, has policy-making, legislative and budgetary functions. The Council is composed of the ministers of member states responsible for a specific area of policy. The ministers or their representative will commit the government of the member state in questions of policy and cast the member state vote.  The Lisbon Treaty specifies in Article 16 that the Council shall act by a qualified majority voting (QMV) in areas of competence with certain exceptions. Qualified majority voting now extends to policy areas that required unanimity according to the Nice Treaty.

The new areas of QMV are:

! Area !! Nice !! Lisbon !! Reference
|-
| Initiatives of the High Representative for Foreign Affairs || Unanimity || QMV following unanimous request || 15b TEU
|-
| Rules concerning the European Defence Agency || Unanimity || QMV || 45(2) TEU
|-
| Freedom to establish a business || Unanimity || QMV || 50 TFEU 
|-
| Self-employment access rights || Unanimity || QMV || 50 TFEU
|-
| Freedom, security and justice – cooperation and evaluation || Unanimity || QMV || 70 TFEU
|-
| Border checks || Unanimity || QMV || 77 TFEU
|-
| Asylum || Unanimity || QMV || 78 TFEU
|-
| Immigration || Unanimity || QMV || 79 TFEU
|-
| Crime prevention incentives || Unanimity || QMV || 69c TFEU
|-
| Eurojust || Unanimity || QMV || 69d TFEU
|-
| Police cooperation || Unanimity || QMV || 69f TFEU
|-
| Europol || Unanimity || QMV || 69g TFEU
|-
| Transport || Unanimity || QMV || 71§2 TFEU
|-
| European Central Bank || Unanimity || QMV (in part) || 129 TFEU, 283 TFEU
|-
| Culture || Unanimity || QMV || 151 TFEU
|-
| Structural and Cohension Funds || Unanimity || QMV || 161 TFEU
|-
| Organisation of the Council of the European Union || Unanimity || QMV || 201b TFEU
|-
| European Court of Justice || Unanimity || QMV || 245, 224a, 225a TFEU
|-
| Freedom of movement for workers || Unanimity || QMV || 46 TFEU
|-
| Social security || Unanimity || QMV || 48 TFEU
|-
| Criminal judicial cooperation || Unanimity || QMV || 69a TFEU
|-
| Criminal law || Unanimity || QMV || 69b TFEU
|-
| President of the European Council election || (New item) || QMV || 9b§5 TEU
|-
| Foreign Affairs High Representative election || (New item) || QMV || 9e§1 TEU
|-
| Funding the Common Foreign and Security Policy || Unanimity || QMV || 28 TEU
|-
| Common defense policy || Unanimity || QMV || 28e TEU
|-
| Withdrawal of a member state || (new item) || QMV || 49a TEU
|-
| General economic interest services || Unanimity || QMV || 16 TFEU
|-
| Diplomatic and consular protection || Unanimity || QMV || 20 TFEU
|-
| Citizens initiative regulations || Unanimity || QMV || 21 TFEU
|-
| Intellectual property || Unanimity || QMV || 97a TFEU
|-
| Eurozone external representation || Unanimity || QMV || 115c TFEU
|-
| Sport || Unanimity || QMV || 149 TFEU
|-
| Space || Unanimity || QMV || 172a TFEU
|-
| Energy || Unanimity || QMV || 176a TFEU
|-
| Tourism || Unanimity || QMV || 176b TFEU
|-
| Civil protection || Unanimity || QMV || 176c TFEU
|-
| Administrative cooperation || Unanimity || QMV || 176d TFEU
|-
| Emergency international aid || Unanimity || QMV || 188i TFEU
|-
| Humanitarian aid || Unanimity || QMV || 188j TFEU
|-
| Response to natural disasters or terrorism || (new item)|| QMV || 188R§3 TFEU
|-
| Economic and Social Committee || QMV || QMV || 256a TFEU
|-
| Committee of the Regions || Unanimity || QMV || 256a TFEU
|-
| Economic and Social Committee || Unanimity || QMV || 256a TFEU
|-
| The EU budget || Unanimity || QMV || 269 TFEU
|-

Past qualified majority voting rules (1958–2014)
This section presents the former qualified majority voting systems employed in the Council of the European Union, and its predecessor institutions. While some policy areas require unanimity among Council members, for selected policy areas qualified majority voting has existed right from the start. All major treaties have shifted some policy areas from unanimity to qualified majority voting.

Whenever the community was enlarged, voting weights for new members were defined and thresholds re-adjusted by accession treaties. After its inception in 1958, the most notable changes to the voting system occurred:
 with the 1973 enlargement, when the number of votes for the largest member states was increased from 4 to 10,
 with the Treaty of Nice, when the maximum number of votes was increased to 29, thresholds became defined in terms of percentages, and a direct population-dependent condition was introduced,
 with the Treaty of Lisbon, when the concept of votes was abandoned in favour of a "double majority" depending only on the number of states and the population represented.
All systems prescribed higher thresholds for passing acts that were not proposed by the Commission. Member states have to cast their votes en bloc (i.e., a member state may not split its votes). Hence, the number of votes rather describes the weight of a member's single vote.

The analysis of the distribution of voting power under different voting rules in the EU Council often requires the use of complex computational methods that go beyond a mere calculation of vote share, such as the Shapley-Shubik index or the Banzhaf measure.

Treaty of Rome (1958–73)
According to Article 148 of the Treaty establishing the European Economic Community (EEC Treaty), acts of the Council required for their adoption:
12 votes (if the act was proposed by the Commission), or
12 votes by at least 4 member states (if the act was not proposed by the Commission).

The values above are related to the EU-6, the founding member states. The treaty allocated the votes as follows:
4 votes: France, Germany, Italy,
2 votes: Belgium, Netherlands,
1 vote: Luxembourg.
Under this system, Luxembourg had no voting power for acts proposed by the Commission.

Accession Treaty (1973–81)
Article 148 of the EEC Treaty, specifying the qualified majority voting system of the Council, was amended by Article 8 of the Accession Treaty regulating the enlargement of the community by Denmark, Ireland, and the United Kingdom. Acts of the Council now required for their adoption:
41 votes (if the act was proposed by the Commission), or
41 votes by at least 6 member states (if the act was not proposed by the Commission).

These values were now related to the EU-9. The treaty allocated the votes as follows:
10 votes: France, Germany, Italy, United Kingdom,
5 votes: Belgium, Netherlands,
3 votes: Denmark, Ireland,
2 votes: Luxembourg.

Accession Treaty (1981–86)
Article 148 of the EEC Treaty, specifying the qualified majority voting system of the Council, was amended by Article 14 of the Accession Treaty regulating the enlargement of the community by Greece. Acts of the Council now required for their adoption:
45 votes (if the act was proposed by the Commission), or
45 votes by at least 6 member states (if the act was not proposed by the Commission).

The votes allocated previously to the EU-9 did not change. Greece was allocated 5 votes.

Accession Treaty (1986–95)
Article 148 of the EEC Treaty, specifying the qualified majority voting system of the Council, was amended by Article 14 of the Accession Treaty regulating the enlargement of the community by Portugal and Spain. Acts of the Council now required for their adoption:
54 votes (if the act was proposed by the Commission), or
54 votes by at least 8 member states (if the act was not proposed by the Commission).

The votes allocated previously to the EU-10 did not change. To the new members, the following votes were allocated:
 8 votes: Spain,
 5 votes: Portugal.

The Treaty of Maastricht established the European Community Treaty (EC Treaty) where the qualified majority voting system was detailed in Article 148. While this treaty transferred some policy areas subject to unanimity to qualified majority, it neither changed the voting weights nor the thresholds.

Accession Treaty (1995–2004)
Article 148 of the EC Treaty, specifying the qualified majority voting system of the Council, was amended by Article 8 of the Accession Treaty regulating the enlargement of the community by Austria, Finland, and Sweden. Acts of the Council now required for their adoption:
62 votes (if the act was proposed by the Commission), or
62 votes by at least 10 member states (if the act was not proposed by the Commission).

The votes allocated previously to the EU-12 did not change. To the new members, the following votes were allocated:
 4 votes: Austria, Sweden,
 3 votes: Finland.

Treaty of Nice (2004–14/17)

The voting system of the Council as defined in the Treaty of Nice was supposed to enter into force on 1 January 2005. However, the voting system was changed before that date by the Treaty of Accession 2003, which entered into force on 1 May 2004. During a temporary period that extended to 1 November 2004, the old pre-Nice voting system was kept, but adapted to the new number of member states. From 1 November 2004, a new voting system based on the Nice system entered into force. The voting weights of the member states according to that voting system are shown in the table on the right. The voting system was replaced by the Treaty of Lisbon, effective 1 November 2014.

The following conditions applied to taking decisions:
 Majority of countries: 50% + one, if proposal made by the Commission; or else at least two-thirds (66.67%), and
 At least 232 votes (1 November 2004–31 December 2006), 255 votes (1 January 2007–30 June 2013), or 260 votes (1 July 2013–31 October 2014), and
 Majority of population: 62%.
The last condition was only checked upon request by a member state.

In the absence of consensus, qualified majority voting was the Council's key way of decision-making. In terms of the statistics before Croatia became a member of the EU (1 July 2013), the pass condition translated into:
 At least 14 (or 18, if proposal was not made by the Commission) countries,
 At least 255 of the total 345 voting weights,
 At least 311 million people represented by the states that vote in favour.
The last requirement was almost always already implied by the condition on the number of voting weights. The rare exceptions to this could occur in certain cases when a proposal was backed by exactly three of the six most populous member states but not including Germany, that is, three of France, UK, Italy, Spain and Poland, and by all or nearly all of the 21 other members.

Note that the Commission could make a proposal in a way that removed the requirement for a qualified majority. For example, the Anti-Dumping Advisory Committee (ADAC) could approve a proposal to impose tariffs based on a simple, unweighted majority, but overturning it would have required a qualified majority because this meant voting against a Commission proposal. This greatly increased the power of small member states in such circumstances.

The declarations of the conference that adopted the Treaty of Nice contained contradictory statements concerning qualified majority voting after the enlargement of the European Union to 25 and 27 members: one declaration specified that the qualifying majority of votes would increase to a maximum of 73.4%, contradicting another declaration which specified a qualifying majority of 258 votes (74.78%) after enlargement to 27 countries.  However, the treaties of accession following the Treaty of Nice clarified the required majority.

After the accession of Croatia, on 1 July 2013, at least 260 votes out of a total of 352 by at least 15 member states were required for legislation to be adopted by qualified majority. Croatia had 7 votes (the same as Denmark, Ireland, Lithuania, Slovakia and Finland).

From 1 July 2013, the pass condition translated into:
 At least 15 (or 18, if proposal was not made by the Commission) countries,
 At least 260 of the total 352 voting weights,
 At least 313.6 million people represented by the states that vote in favour.

Penrose method (rejected)
Poland proposed the Penrose method (also known as the "square root method"), which would narrow the weighting of votes between the largest and smallest countries in terms of population. The Czech Republic supported this method to some extent, but has warned it would not back a Polish veto on this matter. All the other states remained opposed. After previously refusing to discuss the issue, the German government agreed to include it for discussion at the June council. The given percentage is the game theoretical optimal threshold, and is known as the "Jagiellonian Compromise". The Penrose method voting weights allocated to the states are shown in the adjacent table.

According to the proposal, the requirement for an act to pass in the Council was:
 Majority of voting weights: 61.4%.

Unanimity

Certain policy fields remain subject to unanimity in whole or in part, such as:
 membership of the Union (opening of accession negotiations, association, serious violations of the Union's values, etc.);
 change the status of an overseas country or territory (OCT) to an outermost region (OMR) or vice versa. 
 taxation;
 the finances of the Union (own resources, the multiannual financial framework);
 harmonisation in the field of social security and social protection;
 certain provisions in the field of justice and home affairs (the European prosecutor, family law, operational police cooperation, etc.);
 the flexibility clause (352 TFEU) allowing the Union to act to achieve one of its objectives in the absence of a specific legal basis in the treaties;
 the common foreign and security policy, with the exception of certain clearly defined cases;
 the common security and defence policy, with the exception of the establishment of permanent structured cooperation;
 citizenship (the granting of new rights to European citizens, anti-discrimination measures);
 certain institutional issues (the electoral system and composition of the Parliament, certain appointments, the composition of the Committee of the Regions and the European Economic and Social Committee, the seats of the institutions, the language regime, the revision of the treaties, including the bridging clauses, etc.).

Notes

External links
Voting Calculator for Council decisions
A detailed summary of qualified majority voting
BBC: Background on the voting weights discussion
Analysis and history of voting weights in the Council
New winners and old losers. A priori voting power in the EU25
Article at EUABC
Full text of the Constitution – Title IV article I-25 
Completion of the 5-th enlargement and institutional changes (votes in Council and European Parliament including Bulgaria's and Romania's from 1 Jan 2007)
 For context, subsections of this document are entitled "The European Commission", "The Council of the European Union" and "European Parliament".

References

Council of the European Union
European Union legislative procedure